Preiļi Municipality is a municipality in Latgale, Latvia. The municipality was formed in 2000 by merging Aizkalne Parish, Preiļi Parish and Preiļi town. In 2009 it absorbed Pelēči Parish and Sauna Parish, too the administrative centre being Preiļi. The population in 2020 was 9,054.

On 1 July 2021, Preiļi Municipality was enlarged when Riebiņi Municipality, Vārkava Municipality and Aglona Parish were merged into it.

Twin towns — sister cities

Preiļi is twinned with:

 Nizhyn, Ukraine
 Ocnița, Moldova
 Sahil, Azerbaijan
 Utena, Lithuania

See also
Administrative divisions of Latvia

References

 
Municipalities of Latvia
Latgale